The Byton M-Byte was an all-electric battery-powered SUV 2018 concept car from Byton.

Overview

The Byton M-Byte was publicly unveiled at the 2018 Consumer Electronics Show. The car was originally called the Concept, however, this was revised to M-Byte, when the K-Byte was unveiled. It had a 4K curved 48-inch infotainment display, 7 inch display on steering wheel with integrated airbag and was to javein-car gesture control technology. Mass production was expected in mid-2019 and arrival in the United States by 2020.

However, Byton went bankrupt and its work with manufacturing partner Foxconn was halted indefinitely.

See also

Jaguar I-Pace
Audi e-tron
 Mercedes-Benz EQC''
 Tesla Model Y
 Tesla Model X

References

M-Byte
Electric concept cars
Cars introduced in 2018